"Ayrılık Zor" ("Separation is Hard") is a single released by the Turkish pop singer Tarkan in 2005 and sold close to half a million copies. It was released as part of Turkish phone company Avea's new cell phone deal. The single was not available in stores, but was purchased by subscribing to Avea. The concept involved lovers separated by distance using the phone as a means of contact.

Track list
 Ayrılık Zor, 2005
 Ayrılık Zor Original Version (4:05)
 Ayrılık Zor Hakan Özgen Mix (3:49)
 Ayrılık Zor Murat Mathew Erdem Mix (3:50)
 Ayrılık Zor Ozinga Melankoli mix (3:36)
 Ayrılık Zor Ozinga Pop Alaturka Mix (3:33)
 Ayrılık Zor Serkan Dincer Mix (3:52)

See also 
 Turkish pop music

Notes

External links
 Single and Song Lyrics Information in English
 Tarkan @ Avea

2005 singles
Tarkan (singer) songs
Songs written by Tarkan (singer)
2005 songs